Hibiscus leaves pickle is a popular pickle in Andhra Pradesh made with fresh Roselle (Hibiscus sabdariffa) or Gongura  leaves, where it is known as Gongura pacchadi or Gongura Pickle. It is also consumed in Telangana, Tamil Nadu, Maharashtra, and Karnataka. In some of India's North-Eastern states, the plant is known as aamelli or mwitha. These sour/spicy pickles are also available commercially.

Varieties

See also

 Mixed pickle
 Indian pickle
 Indian cuisine
 List of Indian pickles
 List of chutneys
 List of pickled foods

References

External links

Indian condiments
Indian pickles
Pickles
Andhra cuisine
Vegetarian cuisine